

External links 

2009 in United States case law